Chelsie J. Senerchia (November 2, 1899 – June 20, 1990) was an Italian American politician and civil engineer.  He served as city engineer, city manager, commissioner, and mayor of Miami during his political career in South Florida during the 1940s and 1950s.

He was the only son of five children of Antonio Senerchia and Julia di Fiore, both Italian immigrants who settled in Rhode Island. He served as a second lieutenant in the U.S. Army infantry during World War I, and later attended Brown University.

In 1921, he moved to Miami.  He later married Leona Pierce, who was the stand-in for Alice Lake in the 1926 silent movie The Hurricane. They had two daughters, Sallye and Carol.

In 1942, he rejoined the army as an engineer during World War II and was eventually promoted to rank of major.

After the war, he accepted the position of City Engineer for the City of Miami and later became the City Manager.  When the City of Miami commission fired him, he decided to run for office and won as Commissioner and later Mayor of Miami.

In 1959, he became a vice-president of a local savings and loan and served for 20 years.

References
 Orlando Sentinel; Italian Roots for my Dad, Miami Mayor by Sallye S. Casey, December 26, 1998.

1899 births
1990 deaths
American people of Italian descent
Brown University alumni
Mayors of Miami
20th-century American politicians
People from Casselberry, Florida